Leptoceras menziesii, commonly known as rabbit orchid, is a plant in the orchid family, Orchidaceae and the only member of the genus Leptoceras. It is a slender plant, usually found in large colonies and which only flowers after fire. It was one of the first orchids from Western Australia to be described and was given the name Caladenia menziesii, a name still used by some authorities.

Description

There are one to three small flowers, sometimes all white but more usually white, pink and red. The back of the dorsal sepal has many glandular hairs. The labellum has 2 to 4 rows of calli with large heads. The column is erect with wide wings and pink markings. The species flowers from August to November, much more prolifically after recent bushfires, and delayed in some places until after rainfall.

Taxonomy and naming
Caladenia menziesii was one of the first three orchids collected in Western Australia. Archibald Menzies was the collector of the holotype at King George Sound in 1791 during the Vancouver Expedition. It was first formally described by Robert Brown and the description was published in Prodromus Florae Novae Hollandiae et Insulae Van Diemen. In 1840, John Lindley changed the name to Leptoceras menziesii in The Genera and Species of Orchidaceous Plants. Some herbaria continue to use the old name. The specific epithet (menziesii) honours Archibald Menzies.

Distribution and habitat
Rabbit orchid forms colonies using vegetative reproduction in a range of soil types in heath, scrub or forest, mainly in damp areas. It is widely distributed in Victoria, Tasmania, southern South Australia and the south-west of Western Australia.

Conservation
Leptoceras menziesii is classified as "not threatened" by the Government of Western Australia Department of Parks and Wildlife.

References

Diurideae genera
Monotypic Orchidoideae genera
Caladeniinae
Endemic orchids of Australia
Orchids of Western Australia
Orchids of South Australia
Orchids of Victoria (Australia)
Orchids of Tasmania